Theresa's Lover is 1991 South Korean film by Park Chul-soo. Based on a book by Kim Byung-wook, a former music producer meets his second wife Thesesa in United States.

Cast
Lee Young-ha ... Kim Byung-wook
Hwang Shin-hye ... Theresa
Kim Hye-ok ... Wife
Jeong Un-bong 
Kim Deok-nam 
Jeon Mi-seon 
Cheon Yeong-deok 
Yu Yeong-hwi 
Kim Eun-suk 
No Yeong-hwa

External links
 
 

South Korean romantic drama films
1991 films
1991 romantic drama films
Films directed by Park Chul-soo